Franz Schütz (6 December 1900 – 22 March 1955) was a German footballer born in Offenbach am Main.

Club career 
He played in defence for Eintracht Frankfurt, together with Hans Stubb.

International career 
Schütz also played for Germany 11 times between 1929 and 1932.

Honours 
 German Championship: Runner-up 1931–32
 Southern German Championship: 1929–30, 1931–32; runner-up 1927–28, 1930–31
 Bezirksliga Main-Hessen: 1927–28, 1928–29, 1929–30, 1930–31, 1931–32; runner-up 1932–33

Trivia 
He is an honoured captain at Eintracht.

Sources

References

External links 
 
 
 
 Franz Schütz at eintracht-archiv.de 

1900 births
1955 deaths
German footballers
Germany international footballers
Kickers Offenbach players
Eintracht Frankfurt players
Sportspeople from Offenbach am Main
FC Viktoria Köln players
Association football defenders
Footballers from Hesse